Corinne is a census-designated place (CDP) in Wyoming County, West Virginia, United States.

As of the 2010 census, Corinne's population was 362. It has a post office, established in 1916, with a zip code of 25826.

References

Census-designated places in West Virginia
Census-designated places in Wyoming County, West Virginia
Coal towns in West Virginia
Populated places on the Guyandotte River